The 1939 Gonzaga Bulldogs football team was an American football team that represented Gonzaga University during the 1939 college football season. In their first year under head coach Puggy Hunton, the Bulldogs compiled a 6–2 record, shut out five of their last six opponents, and outscored all opponents by a total of 100 to 45. Among its victories, Gonzaga defeated two Pacific Coast Conference teams, including an undefeated Oregon team that was ranked No. 11 prior to the game.

The team was led by backfield star Tony Canadeo who later played 11 seasons for the Green Bay Packers and was inducted into the Pro Football Hall of Fame.

Schedule

References

Gonzaga
Gonzaga Bulldogs football seasons
Gonzaga Bulldogs football